The Oberheim Polyphonic Synthesizer is a range of analog music synthesizers that was produced from 1975 to 1979 by Oberheim Electronics. It was developed by Tom Oberheim, and was the first production synthesizer capable of playing chords.

Specification
Oberheim took the idea and electronics of a Minimoog synthesizer and put them in a small box, making a few changes, and in 1974 introduced the SEM (Synthesizer Expander Module), which became the building block of his polyphonic synths. By strapping two, four, or eight of these SEMs together under keyboard control, he was able to create practical, albeit large, synthesizers that could play two, four, or eight notes simultaneously. The Oberheim Polyphonic Synthesizer was born. Each SEM in an Oberheim Polyphonic generates one voice (or note). 

There was an optional Polyphonic Synthesizer Programmer module (PSP-1) for the four- and eight-voice models with 16 memories, which allowed the user to store and recall some sound settings of the SEMs, and you could glide from one note or chord to another using portamento.

The Oberheim Polyphonic was later outdated by a new line of microprocessor-controlled Oberheim synthesizers, beginning with the OB-X. The OB-X was fully programmable and significantly more compact than the Oberheim Polyphonic. 

Despite their maintenance cost and rarity, Oberheim Polyphonic Synthesizers are still adored by many musicians today for their characteristic sonic 'thickness' and 'depth' caused in part by the random variance between each SEM module.

Notable users

 808 State
 Bill Payne/Little Feat
 Blue Weaver / Bee Gees
 Bob James
 Bomb the Bass
 The Brothers Johnson
 Chick Corea
 Dave Grusin
 Depeche Mode
 Edgar Froese
 Eagles
 Fleetwood Mac
 Gary Wright
 George Duke
 Goldfrapp
 Herbie Hancock
 Hideki Matsutake
 Jean Michel Jarre
 Joe Zawinul / Weather Report
 John Carpenter
 Larry Dunn / Earth, Wind & Fire
 Lyle Mays
 Michael McDonald / Doobie Brothers
 Prince
 Patrick Moraz
 Paul Kantner / Jefferson Starship
 Pete Namlook
 Pink Floyd
 Rose Royce
 Rufus
 Geddy Lee / Rush
 Ryuichi Sakamoto
 Stevie Wonder
 The Stranglers
 Styx
 Supertramp
 Tangerine Dream
 The Human League
 The Shamen
 Trent Reznor
 Vangelis
 Vince Clarke
 Yellow Magic Orchestra

See also
 Polyphonic synthesizer

References

External links
 Two Voice at Vintage Synth Explorer
 Four Voice at Vintage Synth Explorer
 Eight Voice at Vintage Synth Explorer

polyphonic
Analog synthesizers
Polyphonic synthesizers